Abdullah Mukaddam (born 31 March 1988) is a Pakistani cricketer. He made his first-class debut for Karachi Whites in the 2015–16 Quaid-e-Azam Trophy on 2 November 2015.

References

External links
 

1988 births
Living people
Pakistani cricketers
Karachi Whites cricketers
Cricketers from Karachi